The Rana Power Station  (Rana kraftverk) is a hydroelectric power station located in Rana, Nordland, Norway. The station is owned by Statkraft. In terms of annual production in Norway the station is second only to Svartisen Hydroelectric Power Station.

See also

 Storakersvatnet
 Ranelva

References 

Hydroelectric power stations in Norway
Buildings and structures in Nordland
Dams in Norway